The Hawker Hector was a British biplane army co-operation and liaison aircraft of the late 1930s; it served with the Royal Air Force and saw brief combat in the Battle of France in May 1940. Some Hectors were later sold to Ireland. It was named after the Trojan prince Hector.

Design and development
The Hector was intended as a replacement for the Hawker Audax army co-operation aircraft. The design and the building of the prototype was done by Hawker but production aircraft were built by Westland Aircraft in Yeovil, Somerset. Because of the demand for Rolls-Royce Kestrel engines required for the Hawker Hind programme, an alternative power plant was specified. Consequently, the 24 cylinder  Napier Dagger III was used. The prototype first flew on 14 February 1936 with George Bulman as pilot. One prototype and 178 production aircraft were built.

Operational service
Starting in February 1937, the Hector began equipping the seven RAF army co-operation squadrons that would use it, but it in turn began to be replaced by Westland Lysanders beginning in July 1938 The Hectors were transferred to Auxiliary Air Force squadrons. 613 Squadron was converting to Lysanders at RAF Hawkinge and flew in support of the Allied garrison in the Siege of Calais. On 26 May, along with its Lysanders, six Hectors dive bombed German positions around Calais and on the following day, tried to drop supplies to the troops, unaware that they had already surrendered; two Hectors were lost. Hectors were used by the RAF from 1940 as target-tugs, and for towing General Aircraft Hotspur training gliders.

The Irish Air Corps received 13 examples after the Dunkirk Evacuation in 1941–42 and in general were in poor condition. They were sold by the British War Office to Ireland upon requests for aircraft as the Irish military found themselves wholly unprepared for modern warfare but still relied almost completely on Britain for military supplies. The defence of Ireland was in the British interest but while they were fighting the Battle of Britain, they could not afford to sell the Irish Government anything better than the Hector. The type was deeply unpopular with ground crews due to the complicated and unreliable Dagger engine, whose tightly packed high revving 24 cylinders made access difficult.

Variants
 Hector Mk I : Two-seat army co-operation aircraft for the RAF.

Operators

 Irish Air Corps

 Royal Air Force
 No. 2 Squadron RAF
 No. 4 Squadron RAF
 No. 13 Squadron RAF
 No. 26 Squadron RAF
 No. 53 Squadron RAF
 No. 59 Squadron RAF
 No. 296 Squadron RAF
 No. 602 Squadron RAF
 No. 612 Squadron RAF
 No. 613 Squadron RAF
 No. 614 Squadron RAF
 No. 615 Squadron RAF

Specifications (Hector)

Surviving aircraft
In 1996, an ex-Irish Air Corps Hector 88 (ex RAF K8130) was recovered for eventual restoration from near Dundrum in Ireland.

Parts of Hector K8096 remain on Red Pike in the English Lake District. The aircraft crashed on 8 September 1941, killing its pilot.

See also

References

Citations

Bibliography
 Air Transport Auxiliary Ferry Pilots Notes (reproduction). Elvington, York, UK: Yorkshire Air Museum, 1996. .
 Crawford, Alex. Hawker Hart Family. Redbourn, Hertfordshire, UK: Mushroom Model Publications Ltd., 2008. .
 Halley, James J. The Squadrons of the Royal Air Force. Tonbridge, Kent, UK: Air Britain (Historians), 1980. .
 
 Mason, Francis K. Hawker Aircraft since 1920. London: Putnam, 1961 (Third revised Edition 1991). .
 Mason, Francis K. The British Bomber since 1914. London: Putnam. 1994. .
 
 

1930s British military reconnaissance aircraft
Hector
Biplanes
Single-engined tractor aircraft
Glider tugs
Aircraft first flown in 1936